Sicklerville is an unincorporated community located within Gloucester Township, Washington Township, and Winslow Township in Camden County and Gloucester County, New Jersey, United States. It was founded in 1851 by John Sickler, who lived in the area when the present-day town was located within Gloucester Township. The area is served as United States Postal Service ZIP Code 08081.

History
In 1874, the Sicklerville Post Office was established. Paul H. Sickler (his descendants still live in Winslow Township) was appointed the first Postmaster. Today, the Post Office is located near the original location on Sicklerville Road. The post office also services contiguous addresses in portions of Gloucester Township and Washington Township.

Sicklerville was founded as "Sickler Town". In 1886, there were only ten residences in Sicklerville.

Demographics

2010 Census
At the 2010 census, there were 50,589 people, 17,007 households, and 13,209 families living in the town. There were 17,805 housing units at an average density of 172.8/sq mi (66.7/km). The racial make-up of the town is 45.3% White, 44.9% African American, 0.3% Native American, 4.1% Asian, 0.0% Pacific Islander, 2.3% from other races, and 3.1% from two or more races. Hispanic or Latino of any race were 7.0% of the population.

Of the 6,873 households 40.4% had children under the age of 18 living with them, 55.7% were married couples living together, 16.7% had a female householder with no husband present, and 22.3% were non-families. 17.9% of households were one person and 5.4% were one person aged 65 or older. The average household size was 2.97 and the average family size was 3.37.

The age distribution was 31.4% under the age of 19, 6.1% from 19 to 24, 27.7% from 25 to 44, 27.3% from 45 to 64, and 7.5% 65 or older. The median age was 35.3 years. The population is 51.9% female and 48.1% male.

The median household income was $79,746 and the median family income  was $90,510. Males had a median income $63,818 versus $50,935 for females. The per capita income for the town was $31,468. About 5.4% of families and 7.3% of the population were below the poverty line, including 11.8% of those under age 18 and 5.5% of those age 65 or over.

2000 Census
At the 2000 census, there were 42,891 people, 14,066 households, and 11,342 families living in the town. There were 14,811 housing units at an average density of 172.8/sq mi (66.7/km). The racial make-up of the town is 68.2% White, 26.3% African American, 0.3% Native American, 2.1% Asian, 0.0% Pacific Islander, 1.1% from other races, and 1.9% from two or more races. Hispanic or Latino of any race were 3.5% of the population.

Of the 5,483 households 49.1% had children under the age of 18 living with them, 62.5% were married couples living together, 13.8% had a female householder with no husband present, and 19.4% were non-families. 15.5% of households were one person and 4.2% were one person aged 65 or older. The average household size was 3.05 and the average family size was 3.41.

The age distribution was 21.8% under the age of 18, 4.8% from 18 to 24, 35.5% from 25 to 44, 18.8% from 45 to 64, and 5.5% 65 or older. The median age was 38 years. For every 100 females, there were 88.7 males. For every 100 females age 18 and over, there were 85.4 males.

The median household income was $61,366 and the median family income  was $66,234. Males had a median income of $46,143 versus $32,420 for females. The per capita income for the town was $21,903. About 4.8% of families and 5.8% of the population were below the poverty line, including 7.3% of those under age 18 and 5.0% of those age 65 or over.

Houses of worship
Places of worship in Sicklerville include:
Two Baptist churches
The Sicklerville Methodist Episcopal (oldest church, constructed over 131 years ago)
One other Methodist church
One Catholic church – St. Charles Borromeo
R.S. Fink Shrine (second-oldest church, constructed over 127 years ago)
Iglesia ni Cristo Church
Stagecoach Road Christian Fellowship

Notable people
People who were born in, residents of, or otherwise closely associated with Sicklerville include:
 Jordan Burroughs (born 1988), Olympic gold medalist 2012 – freestyle wrestling
 Damiere Byrd (born 1993), wide receiver for the Chicago Bears
 Ed Forchion (born 1964), marijuana rights activist who uses the name "NJWEEDMAN"
 Priscilla Frederick (born 1989), high jumper and silver medalist at the 2015 Pan American Games
 Shonn Greene (born 1985), former running back for the New York Jets
 Kyle Hines (born 1986), one of only six players in NCAA basketball history to amass 2,000 points, 1,000 rebounds and 300 blocks in a collegiate career
 Tziarra King (born 1998), professional soccer player who plays as a forward for National Women's Soccer League (NWSL) club Utah Royals FC
 Devin Leary, American football quarterback for the NC State Wolfpack
 Brendan McHugh (born 1990), swimmer who specializes in breaststroke events
 Hakeem Valles (born 1992), tight end for the Arizona Cardinals
 Max Valles (born 1994), defensive end for the Buffalo Bills

References

Unincorporated communities in Camden County, New Jersey
Unincorporated communities in New Jersey
Winslow Township, New Jersey
1851 establishments in New Jersey
Populated places established in 1851